This is a list of toll roads in Indonesia grouped per province. Only toll roads that are either completely or partially operational are included. Partially opened toll roads are listed in italics.

Toll roads are operated by state-owned company Jasa Marga and various private companies. All operators are under the auspices of Toll Road Regulatory Agency (Badan Pengatur Jalan Tol, BPJT) of the Ministry of Public Works and People's Housing.

Lists

Source : BUJT

Gallery

See also
 Trans-Java Toll Road
 Trans-Sumatra Toll Road

References

 (GIS BPJT) live update webpage map

External links
 Toll Road Regulatory Agency (Badan Pengatur Jalan Tol) website
 Jasa Marga
 CMNP

Infrastructure in Indonesia
Toll roads in Indonesia
Indonesia Toll Roads
Toll roads
Toll roads